The 2014 Arkansas–Pine Bluff Golden Lions football team represented the University of Arkansas at Pine Bluff in the 2014 NCAA Division I FCS football season. The Golden Lions were led by seventh-year head coach Monte Coleman and played their home games at Golden Lion Stadium as a member of the West Division of the Southwestern Athletic Conference (SWAC). They finished the season 4–7, 3–6 in SWAC play to finish in a tie for fourth place in the West Division.

Schedule

References

Arkansas-Pine Bluff
Arkansas–Pine Bluff Golden Lions football seasons
Arkansas-Pine Bluff Golden Lions f